Amos Omeje (born 3 August 1988) is a Nigerian footballer.

Career

Air India
Omeje made his debut for Air India FC on 19 March 2013 against Churchill Brothers in an I-League match held at the Duler Stadium in which Air India lost 3–0.

Career statistics

Club
Statistics accurate as of 12 May 2013

References

External links 
 

1988 births
Living people
I-League players
Association football midfielders
Expatriate footballers in India
Nigerian footballers
Nigerian expatriate sportspeople in India
Air India FC players
Place of birth missing (living people)